AGBC may refer to:

 Attorney General of British Columbia
 Auditor General of British Columbia